Populist Party may refer to:

Croatian Popular Party (1919), a Croatian right-wing party also known as Croatian Populist Party
Indonesian National Populist Fortress Party, an Indonesian populist party supportive of Pancasila ideology
Narodnik, a movement in late Tsarist Russia, whose name can be translated as "Populist" and whose ideology has been referenced as "Populism", in scholarly literature
Parti populiste (French Populist Party), a nationalist and eurosceptic organization in France
People's Party (Greece) (Λαїκό Κομμα, Laiko Komma or Laikon Komma), a conservative-monarchist early 20th century Greek party, whose name can be translated as Populist Party
People's Party (Spain) (Partido Popular), a conservative party in Spain
People's Party of Georgia (US) ( Populist Party of Georgia), the Georgia chapter of the 19th and early 20th century American Populist Party
Populist Party (Northern Cyprus), a defunct party in Northern Cyprus
Populist Party (Turkey) (Halkçı Parti), a former kemalist socialist Turkish party translated both as People's Party and as Populist Party
People's Party (United States) (1887–1908), a radical agrarian-oriented American political party commonly called "the Populists"
People's Party (United States, 1971) (1973–1976), sometimes also called Populist Party; inspired by the People's Party of the 1887-1908 period
Populist Party (United States, 1984) (1984–1996), a far-right political party
Populist Party Ontario, a minor provincial political party in Ontario, Canada
Social Democratic Populist Party (Turkey), a former kemalist social democratic Turkish party
Vietnam Populist Party, a pro-democracy party in Vietnam, called For The Vietnamese People Party by the state media

See also
People's Party (disambiguation)
Partido Popular (disambiguation)

sv:Populistiskt parti